Vivarium Inc. is a Japanese video game developer founded in 1996 by company president Yoot Saito. It is famous for designing innovative video games which use voice recognition technology. Seaman for the Dreamcast is their most famous game to date. Odama, for the GameCube, was also developed by Vivarium.

In 2012 the company released Aero Porter, a simulation game which is a part of the video game compilation Guild01 for the Nintendo 3DS handheld. In the Americas and Europe, the game was released as a standalone title on the Nintendo's eShop.

History
 1993 - Yoot Saito founded OPeNBooK Co., Ltd.
 1996-04-04 - Yoot Saito founded VIVARIUM.
 1996-10 - OPeNBooK merged with 9003, inc and became OPeNBooK9003 inc. (オープンブック9003株式会社). Later, Yoot Saito retired from OPeNBooK9003.
 2000 - The original staff of OPeNBooK within OPeNBooK9003 left company and founded OPeNBooK (オープンブック). The new company held copyright for The Tower, but OPeNBooK9003 held copyrights for Aquazone: Desktop Life and Pina: Desktop Life. As a result, in 2003-3-21, OPeNBooK9003 inc. announced ending the production of The Tower II on 2003-3-31, followed by ending the sale of the game at AZ-SHOP and AZ-SHOP ONLINE on 2000-4-3. Support of the games continued until 2001-3-31.
 2000-7-1 - OPeNBooK9003 inc. was renamed to Cinomix, inc.
 2004-10 - VIVARIUM merged with OPeNBook, and renamed to VIVARIUM Inc.

Games developed as OPeNBooK
 SimTower: The Vertical Empire (1994) (Microsoft Windows)

Games developed as OPeNBooK9003
 Yoot Tower (1998) (Microsoft Windows)

Games developed as VIVARIUM
 Seaman (1999) (Dreamcast and PlayStation 2)
 The Tower SP (2006) (Game Boy Advance)
 Odama (2006) (Nintendo GameCube)
 Seaman 2 (2007) (PlayStation 2)
 The Tower DS (2008) (Nintendo DS)
 Guild01 / Aero Porter (2012) (Nintendo 3DS)

References

External links
 VIVARIUM's official web site

Software companies based in Tokyo
Video game companies established in 1996
Video game companies of Japan
Video game development companies